Cyrtodactylus annulatus, also known as the annulated bow-fingered gecko or small bent-toed gecko, is a species of gecko endemic to the Philippines.

References

Cyrtodactylus
Endemic fauna of the Philippines
Reptiles of the Philippines
Taxa named by Edward Harrison Taylor
Reptiles described in 1915